The H.C. Godman Company was a shoe manufacturer based in Columbus, Ohio. The manufacturer was the first of significance in the city, founded by Henry Clay Godman as Hodder and Godman Leather in 1876. It operated until 1962, only one of two local shoe manufacturers in Columbus to survive into the 1960s.

The company had its main factory at 347 W. Broad Street in the city's Franklinton neighborhood. At its height, it produced shoes in six locations around Columbus. The H.C. Godman Co. Building, located in Downtown Columbus, was listed on the National Register of Historic Places in 2018.

References

External links
 

1876 establishments in Ohio
1962 disestablishments in Ohio
Shoe companies of the United States
Defunct companies based in Columbus, Ohio
American companies disestablished in 1962
American companies established in 1876
National Register of Historic Places in Columbus, Ohio